Povinelli is a surname. It may refer to:

 Elizabeth Povinelli, professor of anthropology and gender studies
 Mark Povinelli (born 1971), American stage, television and movie actor
 Michelle Povinelli, American physicist
 Roland Povinelli (born 1941), French politician